Por or POR may refer to:

Por
Por (Thai word)
Por, Armenia, a town
 Por, a Spanish preposition
 Por, a Portuguese preposition

POR
 POR (gene), cytochrome P450 reductase
 Power-on reset
 Program of Record (PoR), a term used in US government procurement
The Policy, Organisation and Rules of The Scout Association in the United Kingdom

Politics
 Partido Obrero Revolucionario (disambiguation), commonly referred to by the Spanish initials POR
 Party of the Right (disambiguation), any of several organizations

Places
 Portland Transportation Center, US, Amtrak station code 
 Pori Airport, Finland; IATA airport code
 Porth railway station, Wales; National Rail station code

See also
Poor (disambiguation)
Pore (disambiguation)